Conus australis, common name the austral cone, is a species of sea snail, a marine gastropod mollusk in the family Conidae, the cone snails and their allies.

Like all species within the genus Conus, these snails are predatory and venomous. They are capable of "stinging" humans, therefore live ones should be handled carefully or not at all.

Description
The size of the shell varies between 40 mm and 123 mm. The shell is distantly channeled throughout. The interstices are usually plane, sometimes minutely granular. The channels are narrow and longitudinally striated. The spire is much elevated, acuminated, striate, sometimes obscurely minutely coronated. The color of the shell is yellowish brown, with light chestnut longitudinal short irregular lines, and clouds of the same color forming three obscure interrupted bands.

Distribution
This marine species occurs off Japan and in the South China Sea; also off New Caledonia and the Philippines.

References

 Raybaudi Massilia L. (1989) Conidae: una nuova sottospecie dalle Isole Solomone Conus (Asprella) armadillo gabryae subspecies nova. The Connoisseur of Seashells 23
 Filmer R.M. (2001). A Catalogue of Nomenclature and Taxonomy in the Living Conidae 1758 – 1998. Backhuys Publishers, Leiden. 388pp.
 Tucker J.K. (2009). Recent cone species database. September 4, 2009 Edition.
 Tucker J.K. & Tenorio M.J. (2009) Systematic classification of Recent and fossil conoidean gastropods. Hackenheim: Conchbooks. 296 pp.
 Petit R.E. (2009) George Brettingham Sowerby, I, II & III: their conchological publications and molluscan taxa. Zootaxa 2189: 1–218.
 Puillandre N., Duda T.F., Meyer C., Olivera B.M. & Bouchet P. (2015). One, four or 100 genera? A new classification of the cone snails. Journal of Molluscan Studies. 81: 1–23

External links

 The Conus Biodiversity website
 Cone Shells – Knights of the Sea
 

australis
Gastropods described in 1802